M.CT.M Chidambaram Chettyar International School is commonly known as MCTM International School. It is run by MCTM Educational Service Trust.

MCTM Educational Service Trust
Schools run by the true include:

 M.CT.M Chidambaram Chettyar Matriculation Higher Secondary School
 Sir M.CT.M Muthiah Chettyar Higher Secondary School - Purasavalkam, Chennai
 Lady M.CT.Muthiah Chettyar Higher Secondary School for Girls - Purasavalkam, Chennai
 M.CT.M Chidambaram Chettyar Elementary Education - Kanadukathan, Tamil Nadu
 M.CT.M Chidambaram Chettyar Higher Secondary School - Kanadukathan, Tamil Nadu
 M.CT.M Chidambaram Chettyar Memorial Hospital - Rayonpuram

Other Charitable Trusts that are part of the same group are
 S.Rm.M.CT.M Thirupani Trust
 M.CT.M Chidambaram Chettyar Foundation
 M.CT.M Chidambaram Trust
 Sir M.CT.Muthiah Chettyar Family Trust

Degrees
MCTM International School offers a two-year Diploma Programme focusing on ages 16–19. Students are recognized by many universities in India and abroad. Courses include:
 The International Baccalaureate Diploma Programme (IBDP) for 16-19-year-old
 International General Certificate for Secondary Education (IGCSE) for 14-16-year-old
 Cambridge Lower Secondary Programme (LSP) for 11-14-year-old

Developed by a group of international educators, the curriculum focuses on providing more flexibility in studies and gives students opportunities to build on their area of strength apart from regular studies. It also provides students with more exposure to extra-curricular activities with the option of choosing Music, Visual Art, or Dance.

Facilities and Services
MCTM international school conducts programs for career development and betterment of students' fitness. These include:
 The career guidance Counselor - A resource guidance for students and parents to provide students with the up-to-date information on colleges, universities and other post secondary institutions within India and abroad and guide students in choosing electives by finding students' interest for better career performance.
 The Physical development Programme - Sports assessments are included in the regular assessment. To ensure students' participation in each sport, students devote 16 hours over two months and the results reported to their parents.
 Creativity, Action and Service (CAS) - This program is to develop the creative capability of students and this program is added with the regular curricular studies for the International Baccalaureate Diploma Programme.

Infrastructure
 Student Library
 Well Equipped Labs
 Football Field
 Cafeteria
 Cricket Net
 Volleyball Field
 Basketball court

References 
M.CT.M International School Chennai, India
IBO Recognized International School 

International Baccalaureate schools in India
International schools in Chennai